Billings Bridge is a station on the OC Transpo Transitway, adjacent to the Billings Bridge Plaza, Ottawa, Ontario, Canada. It is named for, not only the plaza, but after Billings Bridge itself which is both a nearby bridge and neighbourhood (named for the early settler of the area, Braddish Billings). The transitway station itself is a major stop on the southern transitway-line due to its location near Bank Street, Ottawa's major north–south road and the mall itself. The station is located just south of the Plaza near the intersection between Bank Street and Riverside Drive.

There are two levels on the station. The upper level is on the transitway itself, while the lower level serves buses coming from the nearby Data Centre Road and Bank Street. There is a pedestrian bridge that leads from the lower level to the Plaza.

The station was officially opened with the southern transitway on September 3, 1995, replacing a temporary station which had existed on the site since the 1980s.  Previously, the shopping centre had been served by buses which collected and discharged passengers at stops along the front of the plaza.

Service

The following routes serve Billings Bridge:

Notes 
 Route  starts and ends at this station on weekends and statutory holidays, as opposed to starting and ending at Carleton University.
 After 9pm, All buses serve the lower level night stop only.

References

External links

OC Transpo station page
OC Transpo Area Map

1983 establishments in Ontario
Transitway (Ottawa) stations